José Enrique Caraballo Rosal (born 21 February 1996) is a Venezuelan footballer who plays as a forward for Armenian Premier League club Pyunik.

Career
On 15 February 2021, Caraballo signed for Pyunik.

Honours
Pyunik
 Armenian Premier League: 2021–22

References

External links
 

1996 births
Living people
Venezuelan footballers
Venezuela youth international footballers
Venezuela under-20 international footballers
Venezuelan expatriate footballers
Association football forwards
Atlante F.C. footballers
C.D. Huachipato footballers
Real Santa Cruz players
FC Pyunik players
Venezuelan Primera División players
Ascenso MX players
Chilean Primera División players
Bolivian Primera División players
Armenian Premier League players
Expatriate footballers in Chile
Expatriate footballers in Mexico
Expatriate footballers in Bolivia
Expatriate footballers in Armenia
Venezuelan expatriate sportspeople in Chile
Venezuelan expatriate sportspeople in Mexico
People from Carúpano
21st-century Venezuelan people